Glenn Brier (April 26, 1913 - January 2, 1998) was an American statistician, weather forecaster and academic.


Biography 
Brier was born in Woodbridge, Virginia, on April 26, 1913, and died on January 2, 1998. He married Josephine Hartz and had three children: Richard Paul, Katherine and David.

Career 
Brier worked for the Office of Meteorological Research of the U.S. Weather Bureau, at the U.S. Department of Commerce, from 1939 up to the 1980s.

Legacy 
Brier is best known for creating a scoring rule to measure the accuracy of forecasts, which is known as a Brier score. Because of his work, the score and Brier himself are widely cited by academics related not only to weather-forecasting, but by researchers in several other fields of forecasting, decision science, and various disciplines.

References 

American meteorologists
People from Woodbridge, Virginia
American statisticians
1913 births
1998 deaths